Each year the Hal Schram Mr. Basketball award is given to the person chosen as the best high school senior boys basketball player in the U.S. state of Michigan.  The award is named in honor of the late Hal Schram, a sports writer at the Detroit Free Press who covered high school sports for 40 years before retiring in 1983.

The award has been given since 1981 by the Basketball Coaches Association of Michigan (BCAM).  Most of the award winners have gone on to play at the highest levels of college basketball, and many have gone on to play in the National Basketball Association.

Voting is done on a points system. Each voter selects first, second, and third-place votes. A player receives five points for each first-place vote, three points for each second-place vote, and one point for a third-place vote. The player who receives the most points receives the award. Only "actively coaching" BCAM members can vote. Beginning for the 2007 award, votes may only be cast for a predetermined group of five finalists, whereas in the past, the pool was unlimited.

Mr. Basketball winners

Retro Mr. Basketball winners
In 2010, the BCAM began a 10-year project to honor 'high school senior' boys basketball players from the period prior to the inception of the Mr. Basketball award. The initial awards were announced for players for the years ending in xxx0 - 1920, 1930, 1940, 1950, 1960, 1970 and 1980.  In 2011, awards for next six corresponding 'seniors' for years ending in xxx1 - 1921, 1931, 1941, 1951, 1961, and 1971 -  were named. This pattern continued through the year 2019 when the final award winners were selected for the seasons ending in xxx9.

Most winners by high school (1920-Present)

See also
 Michigan Miss Basketball

References

External links
 http://www.peschstats.com/MrBasketball.htm Michigan High School Basketball Record Book
 http://www.mlive.com/wolverines/index.ssf/2013/03/michigan_signee_derrick_walton_1.html

Michigan
Awards established in 1981
Lists of people from Michigan
Michigan sports-related lists